was a Japanese TV screenwriter. Most of her scripts focus on day-to-day family life and relationships. She won the 83rd Naoki Prize (1980上) for her short stories "Hanano Namae", "Kawauso" and "Inugoya."

Life
Mukōda was born in Tokyo, and moved around Japan in her early life due to her father's job. After she graduated from Jissen Women's College (Jissen Women's University), she got a job at Ondori Company, a film publicity company, in 1952. In 1960, she left the company and became a screenwriter and radiowriter. On August 22, 1981, she died on Far Eastern Air Transport Flight 103 when it crashed in Taiwan.

Works
Some of her short stories are: 
The Name of The Flower
Small Change
I Doubt It
The Otter
Manhattan
Beef Shoulder
The Doghouse
The Fake Egg
Triangular Chop
Mr. Carp
Ears
Half-Moon
The Window
Meeting Again
Ashura no Gotoku

References

Further reading
"Meeting Again" 再会 (Saikai) in Tokyo stories: a literary stroll, Lawrence Rogers (ed.), University of California Press, 2002

External links

Kuniko Mukoda's grave
Prominent people of Minato City(Kuniko Mukoda)

1929 births
1981 deaths
Japanese essayists
20th-century Japanese novelists
Victims of aviation accidents or incidents in Taiwan
Japanese television writers
Japanese women short story writers
Writers from Tokyo
Naoki Prize winners
20th-century Japanese short story writers
20th-century essayists
20th-century women writers
Women television writers
20th-century Japanese screenwriters